The Computer History Museum (CHM) is a museum of computer history, located in Mountain View, California. The museum presents stories and artifacts of Silicon Valley and the information age, and explores the computing revolution and its impact on society.

History
The museum's origins date to 1968 when Gordon Bell began a quest for a historical collection and, at that same time, others were looking to preserve the Whirlwind computer.  The resulting Museum Project had its first exhibit in 1975, located in a converted coat closet in a DEC lobby. In 1978, the museum, now The Digital Computer Museum (TDCM), moved to a larger DEC lobby in Marlborough, Massachusetts. Maurice Wilkes presented the first lecture at TDCM in 1979 – the presentation of such lectures has continued to the present time.

TDCM incorporated as The Computer Museum (TCM) in 1982. In 1984, TCM moved to Boston, locating on Museum Wharf.

In 1996/1997, the TCM History Center (TCMHC) was established; a site at Moffett Field was provided by NASA (an old building that was previously the Naval Base furniture store) and a large number of artifacts were shipped there from TCM.

In 1999, TCMHC incorporated and TCM ceased operation, shipping its remaining artifacts to TCMHC in 2000.  The name TCM had been retained by the Boston Museum of Science so, in 2000, the name TCMHC was changed to Computer History Museum (CHM).

In 2002, CHM opened its new building, previously occupied by Silicon Graphics, at 1401 N. Shoreline Blvd in Mountain View, California, to the public. The facility was later heavily renovated and underwent a two-year $19 million makeover before reopening in January 2011.

John Hollar, a former media executive, was appointed CEO in July 2008.  Dan'l Lewin, a former technology executive, replaced Hollar as CEO in March 2018.

Collections and exhibition space

The Computer History Museum claims to house the largest and most significant collection of computing artifacts in the world. This includes many rare or one-of-a-kind objects such as a Cray-1 supercomputer as well as a Cray-2, Cray-3, the Utah teapot, the 1969 Neiman Marcus Kitchen Computer, an Apple I, and an example of the first generation of Google's racks of custom-designed web servers.

The CHM oral history program conducts video interviews around the history of computing,  This includes computer systems, networking, data-processing, memory, and data-storage. There are over 1,000 interviews recorded as of 2021, including panel discussions on the origins of the IBM PC and the hard disk drive, and individual interviews with Joanna Hoffman, Steve Chen, Dame Stephanie Shirley, and Donald Knuth.

The museum's  exhibit "Revolution: The First 2000 Years of Computing," opened to the public on January 13, 2011. It covers the history of computing in 20 galleries, from the abacus to the Internet. The entire exhibition is also available online.

The museum has a Liquid Galaxy in the "Going Places: A History of Silicon Valley" exhibit. The exhibit has 20 preselected locations that visitors can fly to on the Liquid Galaxy.

Other exhibits include a restoration of an historic PDP-1 minicomputer, two restored IBM 1401 computers, and an exhibit on the history of autonomous vehicles, from torpedoes to self-driving cars.

An operating Difference Engine designed by Charles Babbage in the 1840s and constructed by the Science Museum of London was on display until January 31, 2016. It had been on loan since 2008 from its owner, Nathan Myhrvold, a former Microsoft executive.

Software 
The CHM is also home to an extensive collection of software, curated by Al Kossow, a veteran of Apple Computer whom the museum hired in 2006. Kossow is responsible for preservation and accession of software in the museum, as well as for developing CHM's software-themed exhibitions. Kossow was a contributor to the museum long before being hired full-time and is the proprietor of Bitsavers, a large online repository of historical computer manuals and archived software and firmware acquired from his own collection and through donations from his peers.

In 2010 the museum began with the collection of source code of important software, beginning with Apple's MacPaint 1.3, written in a combination of Assembly and Pascal and available as download for the public.

In 2012 the APL programming language followed.

In February 2013 Adobe Systems, Inc. donated the Photoshop 1.0.1 source code to the collection.

On March 25, 2014 Microsoft followed with the source code donation of SCP MS-DOS 1.25 and a mixture of Altos MS-DOS 2.11 and TeleVideo PC DOS 2.11 as well as Word for Windows 1.1a under their own license.

On October 21, 2014, Xerox Alto's source code and other resources followed.

Past exhibits
On June 23, 1990, the Walk-Through Computer exhibit opened to help visitors learn how computers work. The interactive exhibit included a desktop computer, a giant monitor, a 25-foot keyboard, and a 40-inch diameter trackball (initially planned to be a "bumper-car sized mouse") used by visitors to control the World Traveler program. In the Software Theater, animation and hardware video is used alongside a video feed of the World Traveler Program to show how computer programs work. This exhibit was closed on August 5, 1995, and re-opened as the Walk-Through Computer 2000 on October 21, 1995, to include an updated monitor, 3D graphics, and more interactive features. One of these features allowed visitors to change the pits imprinted on a giant CD-ROM, and the changes are seen on a monitor.

Fellows
The CHM Fellows are men and women 'whose ideas have changed the world [and] affected nearly every human alive today'. The first fellow was Rear Admiral Grace Hopper in 1987. The fellows program has grown to 92 members as of 2022.

See also

 Vintage Computer Festival held annually at The Computer History Museum
 Computer museums
 History of computing
 History of computer science
 Living Computers: Museum + Labs

Notes

References

Further reading
 Bell, Gordon (2011). Out of a Closet: The Early Years of the Computer [x]* Museum. Microsoft Technical Report MSR-TR-2011-44.

External links

 
 
The Computer Museum Archive

Museums established in 1996
Buildings and structures in Mountain View, California
Computer museums in California
Museums in Santa Clara County, California
1996 establishments in California
History of Silicon Valley
Oral history